Matero may refer to

Matero, Lusaka, a neighborhood in Zambia's capital city of Lusaka
Matero (constituency), a parliamentary constituency in Zambia covering the eponymous Lusaka suburb